House No. 13 is a 1991 Bollywood horror film starring Salim Fateh, Anil Dhawan, Rita Bhaduri & Sharat Saxena. The film was a remake of Tamil film Pathimoonam Number Veedu (1990).

Plot
The movie begins as a couple reach a house named House No. 13. And as soon as they enter the house, a series of mysterious events begins revolving around them and every member of the family gets killed by an unknown spirit of a lady.

Cast 
Anil Dhawan 
Salim Fateh 
Rita Bhaduri 
Sharat Saxena

Soundtrack

References

External links

1991 films
1990s Hindi-language films
Indian horror films
Hindi remakes of Tamil films
1991 horror films
Hindi-language horror films
Films directed by Baby (director)